Andrew Michael "Andy" Allen (born 4 August 1955) is a retired American astronaut. A former Marine aviator and lieutenant colonel, he worked as a test pilot before joining NASA in 1987. He flew three Space Shuttle missions before retiring in 1997.

Biography

Andrew Michael Allen was born on 4 August 1955 in Richboro, Pennsylvania. He graduated from Archbishop Wood Catholic High School in 1973, following an education at Richboro Junior High (currently Richboro Middle School). In 2003, he was interviewed for the school's newspaper The Viking Voice about Allen's history with NASA and the future of the agency in regard to the then-recent Space Shuttle Columbia disaster. He subsequently studied at Villanova University where he received a B.S. degree in mechanical engineering in 1977. At Villanova, he was initiated into the Tau Kappa Epsilon fraternity. In 2004, Allen also received a MBA degree from the University of Florida.

Military career
Allen received his commission in the United States Marine Corps at Villanova University in 1977. Following graduation from flight school, he flew F-4 Phantoms from 1980 to 1983 with squadron VMFA-312 at Marine Corps Air Station Beaufort, South Carolina, and was assigned as Aircraft Maintenance Officer. He was selected by Headquarters Marine Corps for fleet introduction of the F/A-18 Hornet, and was assigned to VMFA-531 in Marine Corps Air Station El Toro, California, from 1983 to 1986. During his stay in VMFA-531, he was assigned as the squadron operations officer, and also attended and graduated from the Marine Weapons & Tactics Instructor Course, and the United States Navy Fighter Weapons School (Top Gun). A 1987 graduate of the U.S. Naval Test Pilot School at Naval Air Station Patuxent River, Maryland, he was a test pilot under instruction when advised of his selection to the astronaut program.  He logged over 6,000 flight hours in more than 30 different aircraft.

Awards and decorations
 Defense Superior Service Medal
 Legion of Merit
 Distinguished Flying Cross
 Defense Meritorious Service Medal
 Air Medal (Single Mission)
 NASA Outstanding Leadership Medal
 NASA Exceptional Service Medal
 NASA Space Flight Medal

He also received: Honorary Doctorate of Public Service (D.P.S.) from Bucks County Community College (1993); Honorary Doctorate of Engineering Science (Eng.Sc.D.) from Villanova University (1997) and Honorary Doctorate of Science (Sc.D.) from Daniel Webster College (1998).

NASA experience
Selected by NASA in June 1987, Allen became an astronaut in August 1988. His technical assignments have included: Astronaut Office representative for all Space Shuttle issues related to landing sites, landing and deceleration hardware, including improvements to nosewheel steering, brakes and tires, and drag chute design; Shuttle Avionics Integration Laboratory (SAIL), which oversees, checks, and verifies all Shuttle flight control software and avionics programs; Technical Assistant to the Flight Crew Operations Director who is responsible for and manages all flight crew operations and support; lead of the Astronaut Support Personnel team which oversee Shuttle test, checkout, and preparation at the Kennedy Space Center; Special Assistant to the Director of the Johnson Space Center in Houston, Texas; lead of a Functional Workforce Review at the Kennedy Space Center, Florida, to determine minimal workforce and management structure requirements which allow maximum budget reductions while safely continuing Shuttle Flight Operations; Director of Space Station Requirements at NASA Headquarters, responsible for the International Space Station requirements, policies, external communications and liaison with Congress, international partners, and industry. A veteran of three space flights, Allen has logged over 900 hours in space. He was the pilot on STS-46 in 1992 and STS-62 in 1994, and was mission commander on STS-75 in 1996.

Allen retired from the Marine Corps and left NASA in October 1997. He has since served in various industry leadership positions, including President of the FIRST Foundation (For Inspiration and Recognition of Science and Technology), Associate Program Manager for Ground Operations with United Space Alliance, and is currently a Vice President and General Manager with Jacobs Technology.

Spaceflight experience

STS-46

STS-46 launched July 31, 1992, and landed at the Kennedy Space Center, Florida, on August 8, 1992. The flight completed 126 orbits covering 3.3 million miles in 191.3 hours.

STS-62

Principal payloads of the mission were the United States Microgravity Payload 2 (USMP-2) and the Office of Aeronautics and Space Technology 2 (OAST-2) package. STS-62 launched March 4, 1994, and landed at the Kennedy Space Center, Florida, on March 18, 1994. The flight completed 224 orbits covering 5.8 million miles in 335.3 hours.

STS-75

The TSS successfully demonstrated the ability of tethers to produce electricity. The TSS experiment produced a wealth of new information on the electrodynamics of tethers and plasma physics before the tether broke at 19.7 km, just shy of the 20.7 km goal. The crew also worked around the clock performing combustion experiments and research related to USMP-3 microgravity investigations used to improve production of medicines, metal alloys, and semiconductors. STS-75 launched on February 22 and landed on March 9, 1996. The mission was completed in 252 orbits covering 6.5 million miles in 377 hours and 40 minutes.

External links

References

1955 births
Living people
United States Marine Corps astronauts
Military personnel from Philadelphia
Villanova University alumni
United States Naval Test Pilot School alumni
Warrington College of Business alumni
United States Marine Corps officers
United States Naval Aviators
American test pilots
Recipients of the Legion of Merit
Recipients of the Distinguished Flying Cross (United States)
Recipients of the Air Medal
Recipients of the Defense Superior Service Medal
Recipients of the NASA Exceptional Service Medal
Space Shuttle program astronauts